Jeff McClain (born February 2, 1958) is a former Republican member of the Ohio House of Representatives who represented the 87th District from 2009 to 2016.

Career
McClain was the Wyandot County auditor for over 26 years.

Ohio House of Representatives
When Representative Steve Reinhard was unable to run for another term due to term limits, McClain, along with Lois Fisher, sought the Republican nomination. McClain won the primary election with 60.72% of the votes. He won the general election with 53.63% of the vote. On January 5, 2009, he was sworn into his first term. McClain was elected to a second term in 2010 unopposed. In 2014, McClain was elected to serve his fourth consecutive term with 73% of the vote.

With Senator Karen Gillmor resigning from her seat, McClain had been named as a possible successor. However, the appointment went to David Burke.

Ohio Chamber of Commerce
Term limited in 2016, McClain resigned early to work for the Ohio Chamber of Commerce.

References

Living people
Republican Party members of the Ohio House of Representatives
1958 births
Tiffin University alumni
21st-century American politicians
People from Upper Sandusky, Ohio